Automotive Lighting (AL) is an automotive lighting company that is based in Germany. It was founded in 1999 as a 50-50 joint venture between the Italian firm Magneti Marelli and the German firm Robert Bosch GmbH (K2 Lighting division).

In 2001, Magneti Marelli raised its share to 75% after the acquisition of Seima Group. In 2003, Automotive Lighting become fully owned by Magneti Marelli.

Automotive Lighting was the first company to introduce rear LED lights in 2003 for the Peugeot 307 CC,  and the first full-LED headlamp in mass production for the Audi R8 in 2008.

References

External links

Auto parts suppliers of Germany